R v Woollin was a decision of the highest court of law-defining in English criminal law, in which the subject of intention in mens rea, especially for murder was examined and refined.

Facts
Having given various explanations for his three-month-old son's injuries in the ambulance and in the first two police interviews, Woollin eventually admitted that he had 'lost his cool' when his son had choked on his food. He stated that he had not intended nor thought that he would kill the child and had not wanted the child to die. His actions caused the infant's death as the child hit the floor hard, missing the pram.

Appeals
Woollin's murder conviction was quashed (but not so in the Court of Appeal); leave having been given by the House not the lower court, as the jury instructions were there had to be "substantial risk" of death or grievous bodily harm, which was held to be far wider in scope than virtual certainty; and the actions duly considered in the round on the facts stated as proven by the jury fell short of virtual certainty.

Lord Steyn affirmed the test in R v Nedrick, and Lord Hope of Craighead substituted the verb 'infer' for more common 'find', in the formula by which the jury can find indirect intention,  the intention of the person who does not aim to kill or even to cause grievous bodily harm but nonetheless takes (what he knows to be) an outrageously high risk of doing so to someone around, where the result of the action was virtually certain to be death or grievous bodily harm (objective test), and the defendant personally foresaw this (subjective test):

That verb "entitles" rather than say "obliged" or "have to" connotes that they have no obligation to find the intention—it stresses the second limb requirement: they need to feel there is circumstantial evidence (or an admission) for a consensus that the defendant must surely have appreciated death or serious injury would almost certainly happen.

Reception 
In R v Matthews and Alleyne, the Court of Appeal concluded that the Woollin test was an evidential rather than substantial rule of law: judges ought to instruct jurors that they may interpret what they would see as certain knowledge on the defendant's part of the virtually certain consequence of death as evidence of intention, but Woollin does not substantively define a secondary type of intention.

The formula is controversial per a large body of academic experts as it gives no illustrations of when knowledge can be rightly and wrongly imputed (ascribed to a person), and gives breadth for possible leniency on grounds unknown.

References

External links
 Full Text of Case

W
1998 in England
House of Lords cases
1998 in case law
1998 in British law
Incidents of violence against boys